"Do That There" is the first promotional single from Yung Berg's first album Look What You Made Me. The single features the rap group Dude 'n Nem and a verse from their single "Watch My Feet" as the song's hook. Yung Berg said he hoped to release a remix featuring 50 Cent, Twista and Red Cafe.

"Do That There" was only be a street single. The official second single was "The Business", featuring Casha.

The intro of the song is a "diss" to the rapper Bow Wow. However, Yung Berg recently said in an interview that they have ended their disagreement.

Charts

References

2007 songs
2008 singles
Hitmaka songs
Songs written by Hitmaka
MNRK Music Group singles
Epic Records singles
Diss tracks